José Broissart (born 20 February 1947 in Ravenel) is a French former professional footballer played as a midfielder.

References

External links
 
 
 

1947 births
Living people
Association football midfielders
French footballers
France international footballers
Ligue 1 players
Ligue 2 players
AS Beauvais Oise players
Racing Club de France Football players
CS Sedan Ardennes players
AS Saint-Étienne players
SC Bastia players
Olympique Lyonnais players